The 1973 Tennessee Tech Golden Eagles football team represented Tennessee Technological University as a member of the Ohio Valley Conference (OVC) during the 1973 NCAA Division II football season. Led by sixth-year head coach Don Wade, the Golden Eagles compiled an overall record of 2–8–1 with a mark of 1–6 in conference play, tying for seventh place in the OVC. Tennessee Tech played home games at Tucker Stadium in Cookeville, Tennessee.

Schedule

References

Tennessee Tech
Tennessee Tech Golden Eagles football seasons
Tennessee Tech Golden Eagles football